Republic (Moldovan Cyrillic: Република;) is a political party in Transnistria. The party is affiliated with former Transnistrian President Igor Smirnov.

In the legislative elections of 11 December 2005, the party won 13 of the 43 seats. The party failed to win a single seat in the 2010 legislative elections.

Election results 

Political parties in Transnistria